Lucio is an Italian and Spanish male given name derived from the Latin name Lucius. In Portuguese, the given name is accented Lúcio.

Lucio is also an Italian surname.

Given name 
 Lúcio (Lucimar Ferreira da Silva) (born 1978), Brazilian footballer
 Lucio Abis (1926–2014), Italian politician 
 Eduardo Lúcio Esteves Pereira (born 1954), Portuguese goalkeeper
 Lucio Amanti (born 1977), Canadian cellist
 Lucio Battisti (1943–1998), Italian singer-songwriter
 Lucio Blanco (1879–1922), Mexican military officer
 Lucio Cabañas (1938–1974), Mexican teacher, who became a revolutionary
 Lúcio Cardoso (1912–1968), Brazilian writer
 Lúcio Carlos Cajueiro Souza (born 1979), Brazilian footballer
 Lúcio Costa (1902–1998), Brazilian architect and urban planner
 Lucio Dalla (1943–2012), Italian singer-songwriter
 Lúcio Teófilo da Silva (born 1984), Brazilian football player
 Lucio Diodati (born 1955), Italian painter
Lúcio Flávio (disambiguation), several people
 Lucio Fontana (1899–1968), Italian painter and sculptor
 Lucio Fulci (1927–1996), Italian horror film director
 Lucio Gutiérrez (born 1957), President of Ecuador from 2003–2005
 Lucio Serrani (born 1961), Italian hammer thrower
 Lúcio Soares (1934–1988), Portuguese footballer
 Lucio Urtubia (1931–2020), Spanish anarchist
 Lucio Tan (born 1934), Filipino businessman
 Lúcio Wagner (born 1976), Bulgarian footballer

Surname 
 Francisco Andres Lucio (born 1973), American record producer, singer-songwriter, musician and DJ
 Hanibal Lucić (1485–1553) known in Italian as Annibale Lucio, Croatian language poet and playwright from Venetian Dalmatia
 Johannes Lucius (Croatian: Ivan Lučić, Italian: Giovanni Lucio) (1604–1679), historian
 Lucius Accius (170 – c. 86 BC), Roman tragic poet
 Melissa Lucio (born 1969), American woman on death row in Texas
 Lucius Annaeus Seneca (c. 4 BC – AD 65), Roman philosopher
 Shannon Lucio (born 1980), American actress

Fictional characters 
 Lúcio (Overwatch), a player character in the video games Overwatch and Heroes of the Storm
 Lucio, a minor character in Shakespeare's Measure for Measure
Lucio Marcano, an unseen deceased character in the game Mafia III who appears on a collectible cigarette cards in Mafia: Definitive Edition

See also 
 Lucius
 Lucas (disambiguation)
 Lucia (disambiguation)
 Luciano (disambiguation)
 Luci
 San Lucio Pass

Italian masculine given names
Spanish masculine given names
Portuguese masculine given names
Latin-language surnames
Italian-language surnames
Spanish-language surnames
Patronymic surnames